Edward Malcolm Brownlee (1929-2013) was an American sculptor known for his modernist architectural creations with a style influenced by the art of Oceania, Asia, and the Pacific Northwest. He is best known for his work in Hawaii, where he was a frequent collaborator with architect Pete Wimberly.

Life
"Mick" Brownlee was born in Portland, Oregon, on April 23, 1929, and grew up there on the west side in a dilapidated neighborhood where he found many remnants of building materials lying about and began making constructions from them. He joined the Army after three years of high school and was stationed overseas in occupied Japan working as a topographer. Brownlee received his formal education at Oregon State University and at the California College of Arts and Crafts. In 1954, he became the first recipient of a Master of Fine Arts degree from the University of Hawaiʻi. The Hawaii chapter of the American Institute of Architects recognized Brownlee with a special award for “outstanding contributions of art to architecture”.

He is known for doing many of the carvings for Donn Beach at his restaurants and for the original International Market Place, as well as at many other buildings across Hawaii.

Brownlee wrote an article titled "Art: The Complete Education" discussing his thoughts on the teaching of art as a discipline.

He maintained a studio on the Oregon Coast and worked in carved stone and cast bronze until his death on November 24, 2013.

Works
Brownlee’s monumental sculptures may be found in Alaska, Oregon, British Columbia, Fiji, and Hawaii.  In Honolulu, Hawaii, they are located at the Ala Moana Center, the Honolulu International Airport, River Street Mall, the library of Punahou School, and Orvis Auditorium at the University of Hawaii at Manoa.  The 19 foot cast stone sculpture T'sung is typical of his outdoor sculptures.  The Honolulu Museum of Art and the Hawaii State Art Museum are among the public collections holding work by Edward M. Brownlee. Some of his works can be viewed online at the Public Art Archive.

References

Haar, Francis and Neogy, Prithwish, "Artists of Hawaii: Nineteen Painters and Sculptors", University of Hawaii Press, 1974, pages 26-33.
Radford, Georgia and Warren Radford, "Sculpture in the Sun, Hawaiʻi Art for Open Spaces", University of Hawaii Press, 1978, page 92.
Yoshihara, Lisa A., Collective Visions, 1967-1997, Hawaii State Foundation on Culture and the Arts, Honolulu, Hawaii, 1997, pages 140-141.

1929 births
2013 deaths
20th-century American sculptors
20th-century American male artists
Modern sculptors
Oregon State University alumni
University of Hawaiʻi alumni
Sculptors from Hawaii
American male sculptors
California College of the Arts alumni